Awan may refer to:

Places 
 Awan (ancient city), a city-state in Elam in the 3rd millennium BCE
 Awan (region), a town in Guna district, Madhya Pradesh, India
 Awan, Bhulath, a village in Kapurthala district, Punjab, India, Punjab, Pakistan 
Awan Town, a town and union council in Lahore, Punjab, Pakistan
 Awans, a Belgian municipality in the Walloon province of Liège

Other uses 
 Awan (Kuwait), a newspaper
 Awan (religious figure), the wife and sister of Cain
 Awan (surname), including a list of people with the name
 Awan (tribe), a social group of Pakistan

 Awan dynasty, an Elamite dynasty of Iran
 Awan languages, spoken in South America